The Mayor of Matamata-Piako officiates over the Matamata-Piako District of New Zealand's North Island.

Adrienne Wilcock is the current mayor of Matamata-Piako.

List of mayors
Since its formation in 1989, Matamata-Piako District has had five mayors. The following is a complete list:

References

Matamata-Piako
Mayors of places in Waikato
Matamata-Piako District
Mayors of districts in New Zealand